Mont de l'Arpille is a mountain of the Alps, located south-west of Martigny in the Swiss canton of Valais. It is located north of the Col de la Forclaz and geographically part of the Mont Blanc massif.

References

External links
 Mont de l'Arpille on Hikr

Mountains of the Alps
Mountains of Valais
Two-thousanders of Switzerland
Mountains of Switzerland